Amar, después de amar (English: Love after Loving) is a 2017 Argentine telenovela produced by Telefe Contenidos and broadcast by Telefe. The series was recorded entirely in Resolución 4K. Starring Mariano Martínez, Isabel Macedo, Eleonora Wexler and Federico Amador, co-starring Michel Noher and Manuela Pal and with the antagonistic participations of Virginia Lago, Brenda Gandini, Gastón Ricaud, Maximiliano Ghione and Roberto Vallejos. Also with the youth participation of Delfina Chaves, Franco Masini, Manuel Ramos and Camila Mateos. His first broadcast took place on Monday January 23, 2017 at 22:00 with an audience rate of 12.3 points, winning his competition to Quiero vivir a tu lado broadcast by Canal 13.

Plot 
The accident of a couple on the road raises dozens of questions. The woman's body has disappeared. The man remains in a coma. The identity of both reveals a secret: they were not married, they were lovers.

Three years earlier, a friendship between two married couples becomes a prelude to that forbidden love. Raquel and Damián, wealthy fishing entrepreneurs, meet Carolina a young housewife and her husband Santiago, an expanding construction worker.

The change of school of the teenage children of both causes the crossing of their lives. They do not know that the meeting of families will awaken the inevitable relationship between Carolina and Damián.

A story in two times. The secret love of lovers in the past. And the pain of the deceived in the present, which will culminate in a great love story.

Cast
Mariano Martínez as Santiago José Alvarado
Isabel Macedo as Raquel Judith Levin de Kaplan
Eleonora Wexler as Carolina Fazzio de Alvarado
Federico Amador as Kaplan.
Michel Noher as Detective Emeterio Godoy
Manuela Pal as Laura Eyzaguirre de Godoy
Virginia Lago as Myriam Cohen de Kaplan
Claudio Rissi as Antonio Valente
Gastón Ricaud as Andrés Kaplan
Maximiliano Ghione as Isaac Roth
Brenda Gandini as Alina Cifuentes
Marita Ballesteros as Azucena
Camila Mateos as Lola Alvarado
Franco Masini as Nicolás Alvarado
Delfina Chaves as Mía Kaplan
Manuel Ramos as Federico Kaplan
Roberto Vallejos as Vicente Fazio
Federico Tassara as Benjamín Alvarado/Benjamín Kaplan
Hernán Jiménez as Amílcar “Mocheta” Villoldo
Agustín Vera as Gustavo "Bebo" Correa
Cala Zavaleta as Cynthia Levin
Macarena Suárez as Luz Novikov
Santiago Pedrero as Kevin
Juan Bautista Greppi as Juan Wright
Luli Torn as Catalina Bacci
Dana Basso as Alicia De Felipe
Jorge Prado as José "El Sarro" Miguet
Adrián Ero as Pehuen "El Guacho" Bazán/Eusebio Sebastián Miguet
Pablo Bellini as Jesús Novikov
Alejandro Zebe as Samuel "Sammy" Roth
Malena Figo as Gabriela Calabrese
Pablo Novak as Cristian Issel
Óscar Dubini as Arturo Wright 
Estela Garelli as Evelina de Wright
Susana Varela as Celia Bazán
Silvia Geijo as Rosa
Lucrecia Gelardi as Lisa
Agustín Sullivan as Brian
Ana Clara Bérgamo as Sofía
Andrés Caminos as Lorenzo
Gabriel Villalba as Gregorio
Florencia Sacchi as Vanesa
Sabrina Sequeira as Lidia
Ariel Bertone as Mauro
Flavia Marco as Gisela
Guillermina Caro as Mercedes
Javier Niklison as Nazabal
Marina Artigas as Tamara
Carlos Cano as Japo

International versions
 Hiatus

References

External links
  

2017 telenovelas
Argentine telenovelas
Telefe telenovelas
Spanish-language telenovelas
2017 Argentine television series debuts
2017 Argentine television series endings
Nonlinear narrative television series